WFP or World Food Programme is the food-assistance branch of the United Nations.

WFP may also refer to:

 Water Fed Pole, a window cleaning tool
 Western Forest Products, a Canadian lumber company
 Windows File Protection
 Windows Filtering Platform, Microsoft software for (for example) connection monitoring and firewalling
 Witness for Peace, activists against Reagan's support for the Contras
 Working Families Party, an American political party

See also

 WFPS